Val Vigil (July 9, 1947 – February 5, 2021) was an American politician who served in the Colorado House of Representatives from the 32nd district from 1999 to 2007.

He died of a stroke on February 5, 2021, in Thornton, Colorado at age 73.

References

1947 births
2021 deaths
Democratic Party members of the Colorado House of Representatives